Find the Crowd is a live album by Murray Head recorded at three concerts in France. It was released in 1981.

Track listing
All tracks composed by Murray Head; except where indicated
"Los Angeles"
"Losing You" (John Lennon)
"How Many Ways"
"Old Soho"
"Children Only Play"
"Last Daze of an Empire"
"Countryman"
"Never Even Thought"
"Say It Ain't So, Joe"
"Pity the Poor Consumer"

Personnel
Murray Head - vocals
Phil Palmer - guitar
Geoff Richardson - guitar, viola, clarinet
Alan Spenner - bass guitar
Peter Veitch - keyboards, accordion, violin
Trevor Morais - drums
Ginny Clee - percussion, vocals
Technical
Phill Brown - engineer, mixing
Ian Morais - second engineer
Charles Littledale, Phil Palmer, Susan Ellis Jones - photography

External links
Find the Crowd at the official Murray Head site.

Murray Head albums
1981 live albums
Mercury Records live albums